The Great New Orleans Fire (1788) was a fire that destroyed 856 of the 1,100 structures in New Orleans, Louisiana (New Spain), on March 21, 1788, spanning the south central Vieux Carré from Burgundy to Chartres Street, almost to the Mississippi River front buildings. An additional 212 buildings were destroyed in a later citywide fire, on December 8, 1794.

History 
The Good Friday fire began about 1:30 p.m. at the home of Army Treasurer Don Vincente Jose Nuñez, 619 Chartres Street, corner of Wilkinson, less than a block from Jackson Square (Plaza de Armas). Because the fire started on Good Friday, priests refused to allow church bells to be rung as a fire alarm. Within five hours it had consumed almost the entire city as it was fed by a strong wind from the southeast. The fire destroyed virtually all major buildings in the city (now French Quarter), including the church, municipal building, army barracks, armory, and jail. Colonial Governor Esteban Rodríguez Miró set up tents for the homeless.

The fire area stretched between Dauphine Street and the Mississippi River and between Conti Street in the south and St. Philip Street in the north. It spared the riverfront buildings including the Customs House, the tobacco warehouses, the Governor's Building, the Royal Hospital, and the Ursuline Convent.

Colonial officials were to replace the wooden buildings with masonry structures which had courtyards, thick brick walls, arcades, and wrought iron balconies.  Among the new buildings were the central New Orleans (now Jackson Square) fixtures of St. Louis Cathedral, the Cabildo, and the Presbytere. The funds and supervision for the Cathedral and the Cabildo were provided by Don Andres Almonaster y Rojas. The Cabildo burned in the 1794 fire and had to be reconstructed. The Presbytere was built on a somewhat later basis, and Almonaster died before it could be completed.

Governor Miro's report summarized the suffering: 

After six years of rebuilding, on December 8, 1794, another 212 buildings were destroyed in the Great New Orleans Fire of 1794. Still a colony of Spain, rebuilding continued in Spanish style, and most French-style architecture had disappeared from the city.

Notes

Further reading
 Ermus, Cindy. "Reduced to Ashes: The Good Friday Fire of 1788 in Spanish Colonial New Orleans," Louisiana History 54 (Summer 2013), 292–331

References
Episodes of Louisiana Life by Henry C. Castellanos - 1905 (includes full text of Miro's report on fire)
Encyclopedia Louisiana

18th century in New Orleans
1788 disasters
Louisiana (New Spain)
New Orleans
French Quarter
1788 in New Spain
Colonial United States (Spanish)
New Orleans
18th-century fires
1788
18th-century disasters in North America